Oddbjørn Sverre Langlo (20 April 1935, in Stranda – 21 July 2004) was a Norwegian politician for the Conservative Party.

He was elected to the Norwegian Parliament from Møre og Romsdal in 1977, and was re-elected on two occasions.

On the local level he was a member of Stranda municipal council from 1967 to 1975.

Outside politics he graduated as siviløkonom from the Norwegian School of Economics and Business Administration in 1961, and spent the rest of his career as a businessman in his native Stranda.

References

1935 births
2004 deaths
Members of the Storting
Møre og Romsdal politicians
Conservative Party (Norway) politicians
Norwegian School of Economics alumni
20th-century Norwegian businesspeople
20th-century Norwegian politicians
People from Stranda